Alejandro Felipe Paula (1937–2018), Curaçaoan academic, historian and politician
António Paula (born 1937), Portuguese footballer
 Julia Cornelia Paula, Roman noblewoman and Empress of Rome
, Argentinian writer, playwright, stage and film actress, and film director